Annamanum chebanum is a species of beetle in the family Cerambycidae. It was described by Charles Joseph Gahan in 1895. It is known from China, Laos, Vietnam, India and Myanmar.

References

Annamanum
Beetles described in 1895